All Woman is the only studio album by Hurricane G, released on September 16, 1997, through Jellybean Benitez's H.O.L.A. Recordings.

The album was poorly promoted and failed to reach the Billboard album charts, however the album's lead single "Somebody Else" (which used a sampled of The Jones Girls 1979 hit "You Gonna Make Me Love Somebody Else") became a top 10 hit on the Hot Rap Singles chart.

Track listing

Charts

Somebody Else

References

External links
 

1997 debut albums
Albums produced by Domingo (producer)